An immune-mediated inflammatory disease (IMID) is any of a group of conditions or diseases that lack a definitive etiology, but which are characterized by common inflammatory pathways leading to inflammation, and which may result from, or be triggered by, a dysregulation of the normal immune response.  All IMIDs can cause end organ damage, and are associated with increased morbidity and/or mortality.

Inflammation is an important and growing area of biomedical research and health care because inflammation mediates and is the primary driver of many medical disorders and autoimmune diseases, including ankylosing spondylitis, psoriasis, psoriatic arthritis, Behçet's disease, arthritis, inflammatory bowel disease (IBD), and allergy, as well as many cardiovascular, neuromuscular, and infectious diseases.  Some current research even suggests that aging is a consequence, in part, of inflammatory processes.

Characterization

IMID is characterized by immune disregulation, and one underlying manifestation of this immune disregulation is the inappropriate activation of inflammatory cytokines, such as IL-12, IL-6 or TNF alpha, whose actions lead to pathological consequences.

See also

Immune mediated polygenic arthritis

Bibliography

 Shurin, Michael R. and Yuri S. Smolkin (editors). Immune Mediated Diseases: From Theory to Therapy (Advances in Experimental Medicine and Biology). Springer, 2007.

References
idid.us: immune mediated inflammatory diseases, inflammatory diseases of immune dysregulation 

Cause (medicine)
Inflammations
Immune system disorders